The 1999 UCLA Bruins football team represented the University of California, Los Angeles in the 1999 NCAA Division I-A football season.  They played their home games at the Rose Bowl in Pasadena, California and were led by head coach Bob Toledo.

Schedule

Rankings

Roster

References

UCLA
UCLA Bruins football seasons
UCLA Bruins football